Hassam-ud-Din Rashidi (September 20, 1911 – April 1, 1982) was a Pakistani historian and scholar.

Born in 1911 near Nusrat Station, Ratodero Taluka, Larkana District, he was the son of Muhammad Hamid Shah Rashidi and the younger brother of Ali Muhammad Rashidi.  He was a scholar of Sindhi literature as well as a historian, journalist and biographer.

Selected publications

 Molana Muhib Ali Sindhi (Sindhi)
 Sindhi Adab (Urdu)
 Mehran jon Mojoon (Sindhi)
 Masnawi Chanesar NAma az Adarki beglar (preface in Sindhi)
 Maqalat al Shuarai
 Mir Muhammad Masoom Bhakri
 Tazkira e Suarai Kashmir
 Tazkira e Ameer Khani
 Mirza Ghazi Baig aur us ki Bazm e Adab
 Makli Naama
 Turkhan Nama
 Tazkirat e Shora e Kashmir

See also
 Ali Muhammad Rashidi
 Nabi Bux Khan Baloch
 Dr. Umar Bin Muhammad Daudpota
 Mirza Qalich Baig
 Allama I. I. Kazi
 Elsa Kazi
 Muhammad Ibrahim Joyo
 G. M. Syed

References

External links
 Quarterly Mehran Rashidi Number by Sindhi Adabi Board.
 Maroo jee malir ja

1911 births
1982 deaths
Pakistani Muslims
20th-century Pakistani historians
Sindhi-language writers
20th-century Persian-language writers
 Scholars from Sindh
Pakistani Sindhologists
Linguists from Pakistan
Recipients of Sitara-i-Imtiaz
Pakistani literary critics
20th-century linguists